The men's 100 kilograms (Half heavyweight) competition at the 2014 Asian Games in Incheon was held on 22 September at the Dowon Gymnasium.

Naidangiin Tüvshinbayar from Mongolia won the gold medal.

Schedule
All times are Korea Standard Time (UTC+09:00)

Results

Main bracket

Repechage

References

External links
Official website

M100
Judo at the Asian Games Men's Half Heavyweight